Second Nature is the fifth album by Industrial band The Young Gods.

Track listing
 "Lucidogen" – 4:10
 "Supersonic" – 4:19
 "Laisser Couler (Le Son)" – 5:42
 "Astronomic" – 5:45
 "Attends" – 4:01
 "In The Otherland" – 7:34
 "Stick Around" – 2:53
 "The Sound In Your Eyes" – 5:58
 "Toi Du Monde" – 8:08
 "Love 2.7" – 3:40

Accolades
The information regarding accolades acquired from AcclaimedMusic.net

Chart performance

Album

Personnel

The Young Gods
Alain Monod – keyboards
Franz Treichler – vocals, production
Bernard Trontin – drums

Additional musicians and production
Bertrand Siffert – engineering
Benoît Saillet – assistant engineering
Glenn Miller – mastering
René Walker – artwork

Footnotes

The Young Gods albums
2000 albums
Ipecac Recordings albums
Albums produced by Franz Treichler